Elections are currently held every four years to elect the mayor of Hartford, Connecticut.

Until 1969, rather than being individually elected, a mayor was chosen from among the members of The Hartford City Council. From 1969 onward, partisan direct elections have been held to sleet the city's mayor.

Elections were originally to two year terms. On November 5, 2002, residents of Hartford voted to make changes to the Hartford City Charter, which would take effect on January 1, 2004. Among these changes was the extension of mayoral terms to four years.

1935

General election result

Mayor-elect Pilgard died at St. Francis Hospital in Hartford (Saint Francis Hospital & Medical Center) on November 14, 1935. On December 3, 1935, by a 14-6 vote, the city council chose Thomas J. Spellacy to finish Pilgard's term in office.

1937

General election result

1939

General election result

1941

General election result

Mayor Spellacy was also endorsed by the Socialist Party and Union Party tickets.

1943

General election result

Mayor O'Connor was also endorsed by the Socialist Party ticket. He received 22,970 votes on the Democratic Party ballot line and 195 votes on the Socialist Party ballot line. In July 1943, O'Connor had replaced Mayor Thomas J. Spellacy, who had resigned.

1945

General election result

Turnout was approximately 59% of the 82,700 eligible voters.
Mayor Moylan died in office in late December 1946. By a 15-4 vote, the city council chose Edward N. Allen to finish Moylan's term in office.

1947

General election result
On November 4, 1947, the voters elected a nine-member city council in a non-partisan election. The council was tasked with selecting a city manager.

1969

1971

1973

1975

1977

1979

The 1979 Hartford mayoral election was held on November 6, 1979. It saw George A. Athanson win reelection to a fifth term.

Democratic primary
The Democratic primary was held on September 11.

Candidates
George A. Athanson, incumbent mayor
Nicholas R. Carbone, deputy mayor

Results
The city's Democratic committee endorsed Carbone for election ahead of the primary.

Anthanson won by a large margin. The slate for the Democratic nominations for city council he had backed, which was regarded as the "weaker" slate by political observers, also won election.

Turnout was over 46%.

Republican nomination
Hartford's Republican Town Chairman Joseph P. Mozzicato attempted to make sure no Republican nominee would run for the mayoralty, seeing the mayoral election as a losing race, and preferring to spend the party's money focussing on the City Council election. Registered Republican voters comprised only 7,000 of Hartford's roughly 140,000 residents. The Republican Party, however, ultimately nominated Michael T. McGarry.

Petitioning candidates
William E. Glynn (Democrat), former mayor (1961–1965)
Joseph Mazzafera (Independent)

Withdrawn
Donna C. McDonald (U.S. Labor Party)

General election result

1981

The 1981 Hartford mayoral election was held on November 3, 1981. It saw Thirman L. Milner win election. The election made Milner the first popularly elected black mayor of a city in New England. Black people made up one-third of the city's population at the time. Milner defeated five-term incumbent mayor George A. Athanson in the Democratic primary.

Democratic primary

Candidates
George A. Athanson, incumbent mayor
Robert F. Ludgin, deputy mayor and city councilor
Thirman L. Milner, Connecticut state representative
Johanna C. Murphy, community activist

Initial primary (September 8)
Incumbent mayor George A. Athanson won the initial  primary held on September 8, defeating runner-up Milner by a mere 94 votes. This result would ultimately be nullified in court.

Heading into the election, Athanson was regarded to be a well-liked figure in the city.

Milner's strong performance regarded as a surprise, outperforming polls and many expectations. One Hartford Courant poll ahead of the primary had shown Athanson leading Milner by a much greater 14-point margin (35% to 21%).

The result had largely corresponded to racial lines, with Milner performing well in the predominantly black North End (where he lived), and with Athanson and Ludgin splitting the predominantly white South End. Murphy had performed her best in the liberal West End of the city (where she lived). Athanson performed well in the South End of the city. However, he underperformed on the North End, and lost the West End to Murray. Milner performed strongly in the North End of the city, and had some strong performances in some parts of the West End. In the Blue Hills portion of Hartford, Milner routed Athanson.

Ludgin, elected in 1977 to The Hartford City Council as an outsider, had made many enemies and put-off many voters through his aggressive leadership style in his two years in office. Murray, a community activist, was a first-time candidate for elected office.

Unlike in 1979, the city's Democratic committee endorsed Athanson for reelection ahead of the primary.

Rerun (October 13)
Voting irregularities in the September 8 Democratic primary led Connecticut Superior Court judge Douglass B. Wright to order a rerun of the Democratic primary to take place on October 13, after Milner brought a challenge to the court and city officials and Athanson agreed in court to allow a rerun.

In the rerun of the primary, Milner defeated incumbent mayor George A. Athanson, in large part, due to a very strong showing in the city's North End.

Republican primary
Michael T. McGarry won the Republican primary. He defeated Donald B. LaCroix. LaCroix had been endorsed by the city's Republican Party organization ahead of the primary. LaCroix had a record of running losing campaigns for elected office. McGarry had been the more known figure of the two.

Petitioning candidates
Robert F. Ludgin (Democrat)

General election
Milner continued to receive strong support from the city's North Side, winning 90% of the roughly 9,500 votes cast there in the general election.

1983

1985

1987

1989

1991

The 1991 Hartford mayoral election was held on November 5, 1991. Incumbent Carrie Saxon Perry was reelected to a third consecutive term, defeating a challenger in the Democratic primary, and running unopposed in the general election.

Democratic primary
The Democratic primary was held on September 10.

Ahead of the Democratic primary, the city's Democratic Party organization endorsed Robert J. Jackson over the incumbent mayor Carrie Saxon Perry. Perry had gone against the city's Democratic machine and ran her own slate of candidates for City Council in the coinciding city council primaries, which ultimately prevailed over all of the incumbents they were challenging.

Republican nomination
The Republican Party nominated no candidate.

General election

1993

The 1993 Hartford mayoral election was held on November 2, 1993. Incumbent Carrie Saxon Perry lost reelection to Michael P. Peters.

Democratic primary

Candidates
Yolanda Castillo, Hartford City Council majority leader
Henrietta S. Milward, deputy mayor
Carrie Saxon Perry, incumbent mayor
Michael P. Peters, firefighter

Results
Incumbent mayor Carrie Saxon Perry won renomination, carrying a plurality, with 35% of the vote, defeating three opponents. She carried 10 of the 27 precincts for the election. Her margin of victory over runner-up Peters was roughly 700 votes. Turnout comprised roughly 35% of the city's registered Democrats.

Peters was a firefighter who had previously considered an independent run for mayor in the 1991 mayoral general election, but was dissuaded that year after Perry won that year's Democratic primary by a significant margin.

Republican nomination
The Republican Party nominated no candidate.

Petitioning candidates
Kennth A. Mink (Independent)
Michael P. Peters, firefighter (Democrat)
Nora Wyatt Jr., reverend (Independent)

General election
Facing the strong prospect of a loss to Peters, a white candidate, the black Perry brought in several notable black national political figures, such as Carol Moseley Braun and Jesse Jackson, to endorse her. Perry's supporters, at a rally featuring Jackson, distributed flyers which implied that Peters would undo the last decade of progress for the city's black populace.

Perry also received endorsements from mayors of other Connecticut municipalities, such as Bridgeport's Joseph Ganim, New Haven's John C. Daniels and West Haven's Richard Borer. She also received the endorsement of John DeStefano Jr., the Democratic nominee in the coinciding New Haven mayoral election.

While Perry and her supporters adopted the tactic of attacking Peters, Peters largely went without even mentioning Perry, instead focusing on promoting his proposals for the city.

Peters unseated Perry, becoming the first independent to become mayor of Hartford since at least 1953.

Peters benefited from strong support and turnout among the city's white electorate. Turnout in the city's white South End wards averaged 60%, while the citywide turnout only averaged 45%. In the three most predominantly white precincts on the city's South End, Peters won 90% of the vote. Peters also received more support in precincts located in the predominantly black North End than most white candidates had managed to receive there in election over the previous decade, receiving roughly 20% of the vote in those precincts.

Peters carried 19 districts. Perry carried 8 voting districts, most of them being in the North Side.

1995

The 1995 Hartford mayoral election was held on November 7, 1995. Incumbent Michael P. Peters was reelected.

Democratic primary
Incumbent mayor Michael P. Peters defeated city councilwoman Elizabeth Horton Sheff in the Democratic primary.

Republican nomination
The Republican Party nominated no candidate.

Petitioning candidates
Elizabeth Horton Sheff (Democrat), city councilwoman

General election

1997

The 1997 Hartford mayoral election was held on November 4, 1997. Incumbent Michael P. Peters won reelection to a third term.

Democratic nomination
For only the second time in two decades, Hartford did not have a competitive Democratic primary. Activist Kenneth Mink, who had been an announced challenger of incumbent Mike Peters, failed to file on time the proper forms to run against him in the Democratic primary. The last two times that there had been no competitive primary for the Democratic mayoral nomination were 1989 and 1977.

Republican nomination
The Republican Party nominated no candidate.

Other parties
The Pro Hartford Party opted against running a candidate.

Petitioning candidates
Kenneth Mink, activist and 1993 mayoral candidate

General election
Michael P. Peters received the endorsement of the Hartford Courant.

Michael P. Peters won every precinct in the city.

1999

The 1999 Hartford mayoral election was held on November 1, 1999. Democrat Michael P. Peters won reelection to a fourth term.

Democratic primary
Incumbent Michael P. Peters defeated Juan Morales in the Democratic primary. Morales was a tax and banking consultant who worked with insurance companies. Morales was a relative political newcomer, whose previous political experience included running unsuccessfully for Hartford City Council in 1995.

Republican nomination
The Republican Party nominated no candidate.

Write-ins
W. Michael Downes, 1995 mayoral candidate

General election results

2001

The 2001 Hartford mayoral election was held on November 6, 2001. Democrat Eddie Perez won election. Perez became the city's first hispanic mayor. Hartford was, as of the 2000 United States census, 40.52% Hispanic.

Incumbent mayor Michael P. Peters did not seek reelection.

Democratic primary
The Democratic primary took place on September 11, 2001, the same day as the September 11 attacks.

Ahead of the primary, Eddie A. Perez received the endorsement of the city's Democratic Party organization.

Republican nomination
The Republican Party nominated no candidate.

Libertarian nomination
The Libertarian Party nominated Richard Lion.

Petitioning candidates
W. Michael Downes, 1995 and 1999 mayoral candidate
Robert F. Ludgin (Democrat)
Kenneth A. Mink, activist; 1993 and 1997 mayoral candidate
Nora Wyatt, Jr

General election results

2003

The 2003 Hartford mayoral election was held on November 4, 2003. Incumbent Democrat Eddie Perez won reelection.

The election was to a two-year term. However, in 2004, Hartford residents extended their mayoral terms, which extended Perez's second term through 2008.

Democratic primary
Perez won renomination unopposed, in a Democratic Party primary in which 6,267 votes were cast (21% of the city's registered Democrats).

Republican nomination
The Republican Party nominated Michael T. McGarry, who had run before.

Libertarian nomination
The Libertarian Party nominated  Richard Lion, who was also the party's nominee in the 2001 mayoral election.

Petitioning candidates

Withdrawn
Thirman L. Milner, former mayor (1981–1987)

General election results

2007

The 2007 Hartford mayoral election was held on November 6, 2007. Incumbent Democrat Eddie Perez won reelection to a third term.

Democratic primary
The Democratic primary was held on September 11.

Candidates
Frank Barrows, former Connecticut state senator
Art Feltman, Connecticut state representative
I. Charles Matthews, lawyer, former Hartford City Council leader, former deputy mayor
Eddie Perez, incumbent mayor

Disqualified from ballot
Minnie Gonzalez, Connecticut state representative

Campaign
A large focus of the primary campaign was how Perez had become so dominant in the city's politics.

One of the concerns of the primary campaign was that Perez was facing a criminal investigation relating to the remodeling of his home by a city contractor and deals involving city parking lots. Perez apologized for the home-improvement arrangement, and placed one of the parking lot deals back out to bid. In August, criminal investigators raided Perez's house.

Results
Turnout in the Democratic primary was approximately 25% of the city's registered Democrats.

Perez performed well in the city's South End and West End, but lost a number of North End precincts.

Republican nomination
The Republican Party nominated James Stanley McCauley. McCauley was a minister who had a public-access television show.

Petitioning candidates
Rual DeJesus (Democrat)
Minnie Gonzalez (Democrat), Connecticut state representative
I. Charles Matthews (Democrat), lawyer, former Hartford City Council leader, former deputy mayor
Thirman L. Milner (Independent), former mayor (1981–1987)

Withdrawn
Art Feltman (Democrat), Connecticut state representative
Patrice Smith (Democrat), reverend and youth advocate

General election campaign
Winning the Democratic primary in Hartford is generally considered tantamount to election. However, fourteen years earlier, independent Michael P. Peters, who served as mayor from 1993 through 2001, had first won election as a petitioning candidate in the general election, after having failed to win the Democratic primary over then-incumbent Carrie Saxon Perry. Registered Democrats in Hartford numbered 30,039, unaffiliated voters numbered 10,454, and Republicans numbered 1,932.

Despite his controversies, Perez received endorsements from Connecticut attorney general Richard Blumenthal, Democratic state chairwoman Nancy DiNardo, Connecticut state comptroller Nancy Wyman.

Former mayor Michael P. Peters endorsed the candidacy of I. Charles Matthews.

Since launching his candidacy in January 2007, Perez had vastly out fundraised and outspent his opponents, raising $593,000 by the end of October. He spent most of the money raised, with only $54,500 of it remaining unspent by the end of October. He spent on consultants, mailers, and in excess of $150,000 in television advertisements. I. Charles Matthews had raised $131,00 by the end of October, though $88,000 of it was self-funding. Minnie Gonzalez raised $56,000 by the end of October. By the end of October, Rual De Jesus had raised $8,000, Thurman Milner had raised $7,000, and J. Stan McCauley had raised $3,000.

General election results

2011
 
The 2011 Hartford mayoral election was held on November 8, 2011. The election saw incumbent Democrat Pedro Segarra win a first full term. He became the first openly-gay individual elected Mayor of Hartford, making Hartford the second U.S. state capital to elect an openly gay mayor (Providence, Rhode Island was the first when they elected David Cicilline). Segarra also became the second hispanic individual to be elected mayor of Hartford, after Perez. As of the 2010 United States census, 43.43% of Hartford's populace was hispanic, which was the largest percentage of any city in the northeastern United States.

Segarra had become mayor in 2010, after mayor Eddie A. Perez resigned after being convicted of corruption.

Democratic primary
Incumbent Democrat Pedro Segarra won renomination.

Republican nomination
The Republican Party did not nominate a candidate, and instead cross-endorsed incumbent Democrat Pedro Segarra.

Petitioning candidates
James Stanley McCauley, 2007 mayoral candidate
Patrice Smith
Edwin Vargas, Jr.

General election

2015
 
The 2015 Hartford mayoral election was held on November 3, 2015. The election was won by Democrat Luke Bronin. Bronin defeated incumbent Pedro Segarra in the Democratic primary.

Democratic primary
The Democratic primary was held on September 15.

Ahead of the primary, held on Luke Bronin had won the endorsement of the Democratic primary. He defeated incumbent mayor Pedro Segarra in the primary.

Bronin outspent Segarra by a margin of 3 to 1. Bronin had raised $800,000 in his primary campaign.

Turnout in the Democratic primary was approximately 26%.

Republican nomination
Theodore T. Cannon won the Republican nomination.

Petitioning candidates
Joel Cruz, Jr. (independent), city councilman
Patrice Smith

General election
Hartford is a highly Democratic city; therefore, Bronin was anticipated to win the general election.

2019
 
The 2019 Hartford mayoral election was held on November 5, 2019. Incumbent Democrat Luke Bronin won reelection.

Democratic primary
The Democratic primary was held on September 10. The race had been considered competitive. Incumbent mayor Luke Bronin defeated former mayor Eddie Perez and state representative Brandon McGee in the Democratic primary.

Turnout in the Democratic primary was approximately 22%.

Republican nomination
Republicans cross endorsed candidate J. Stan McCauley, who had been running as an independent. This came despite McCauley identifying himself to be a Democrat. McCauley had twice before been a candidate for mayor.

Libertarian endorsement
Aaron Lewis, founder and director of the Scribe's Institute, changed his party affiliation from Democratic to Libertarian few months before the election.

Petitioning candidates
W. Michael Downes	
Giselle Gigi Jacobs
Aaron Lewis (Libertarian)
Eddie Perez, former mayor (2001–2010)

Write-in candidates
Tylon R. Butler

General election results

2023
 
The 2023 Hartford mayoral election will be held on November 7, 2023. Incumbent Democrat Luke Bronin will not run for reelection to a third term.

Democratic primary

Candidates

Declared
Arunan Arulampalam, nonprofit CEO
Eric Coleman, former Connecticut Superior Court justice and former state senator
Renardo Dunn, pastor
John Fonfara, state senator
Tracy Funnye
Nick Lebron, city councilor

Publicly expressed interest
Maly Rosado, president of the Hartford City Council

Declined
Luke Bronin, incumbent mayor

External links
Official campaign websites
 Arunan Arulampalam (D) for Mayor
 Eric Coleman (D) for Mayor

References